Květa Peschke and Katarina Srebotnik were the defending champions but lost in the Semifinals to Nuria Llagostera Vives and María José Martínez Sánchez.
The Spaniard couple won the title by beating Liezel Huber and Lisa Raymond in the final who retired after the first set lost 4–6.

Seeds

Draw

Draw

External links
 Main draw

Aegon International - Doubles
2012 Women's Doubles